Bad Girls Club is an American reality television series.

Bad Girls Club may also refer to:

 Bad Girls Club (album), 2010 album by Kimberly Cole
 "Bad Girls Club" (song), a song by Jeanette from the 2006 album Naked Truth
 "Bad Girls Club" (Wale song), 2011 single by Wale

See also
 Bad Girl (disambiguation)
 Bad Girls (disambiguation)
 List of Bad Girls Club episodes